The women's 100 metres event at the 1973 Summer Universiade was held at the Central Lenin Stadium in Moscow on 16 and 17 August.

Medalists

Results

Heats
Held on 16 August

Wind:Heat 1: +1.0 m/s, Heat 2: 0.0 m/s, Heat 3: +1.2 m/s, Heat 4: ? m/s, Heat 5: -1.3 m/s

Semifinals
Held on 17 August

Wind:Heat 1: 0.0 m/s, Heat 2: 0.0 m/s

Final
Held on 17 August

Wind: -0.6 m/s

References

Athletics at the 1973 Summer Universiade
1973